Pradoxa thomensis is a species of sea snail, a marine gastropod mollusk in the family Muricidae, the murex snails or rock snails. 

The specific name thomensis refers to the island of São Tomé, where the species is found.

Distribution
Pradoxa thomensis occurs on the islands of São Tomé and Príncipe.

References

 Fernandes F. & Rolán E. 1990. Nuevo género y nuevas especies de la familia Buccinidae Rafinesque, 1815 (Mollusca, Neogastropoda) en la isla de São Tomé. Bollettino Malacologico, 25: 9-12

Muricidae
Molluscs of the Atlantic Ocean
Endemic fauna of São Tomé and Príncipe
Invertebrates of São Tomé and Príncipe
Fauna of São Tomé Island
Gastropods described in 1990